Muscle & Fitness is a British fitness magazine, which contains articles on strength and fitness training, diet plans and strategies for men and women, and tips and advice.

History 

In 1940, health and fitness pioneer Joe Weider created a newsletter called ‘Your Physique’, which evolved into Muscle & Fitness, Weider Publications' very first magazine – and its flagship brand. Today, Muscle & Fitness is printed in 16 local editions in more than 22 countries, reaching a worldwide audience of over 7 million readers.

Editorial mix 

It contains a varied mix of features and information on training, nutrition, sports medicine, fashion and technology. Each month its staff answer readers' questions and personal training techniques are demonstrated by fitness professionals.

1940 establishments in the United Kingdom
Sports magazines published in the United Kingdom
Bodybuilding magazines
Fitness magazines
Magazines established in 1940